Charles-Louis-François Desnoyer, or Desnoyers, (6 April 1806 – 6 February 1858) was a 19th-century French actor, playwright and theatre manager.

He also wrote under the pen name Anatole de Beaulieu.

Short biography 
He made his debut as actor and author in 1827 with a comédie en vaudeville, Je serai comédien. He wrote many plays, comedies, dramas and melodramas for theaters on the boulevard du Crime in collaboration with other authors such as Eugène Nus, Léon Beauvallet or Adolphe d'Ennery. General manager of the Théâtre du Gymnase then at the Comédie-Française from 1841 to 1847, he became directing manager of the Théâtre de l'Ambigu-Comique in May 1852

When he died, La Presse read:

Works

Theatre 

1825: L’Amour et la Guerre, vaudeville in 1 act by Charles Varin, Étienne Arago and Desnoyer, Théâtre du Vaudeville (22 August)
1826: Je serai comédien, comedy in 1 act
1828: L'Homme entre deux âges, comedy in 1 act mingled with couplets with Louis Marie Fontan
1828: Le Papier timbré, comedy in 1 act by Desnoyer 
1828: Julien et Justine, ou Encore des ingénus, tableau villageois with Charles-Hippolyte Dubois-Davesnes
1829: Gillette de Narbonne ou le Mari malgré lui, comédie vaudeville in 3 acts with Jean-Joseph Ader and Fontan
1829: Alice ou les Fossoyeurs écossais, melodrama in 3 acts, music by Louis Alexandre Piccinni
1829: Le Ménage du maçon ou les Mauvaises Connaissances, pièce dramatique in 6 days with Dubois-Devesnes
1829: Le Séducteur et son élève, drama in 2 acts 
1830: André le chansonnier, drama in 2 acts, mingled with Fontan
1830: La Leçon de dessin ou Mon ami Polycarpe, comedy in 1 act with Dubois-Davesnes
1831: Casimir ou le Premier Tête-à-tête, opéra comique in 2 acts, music by Adolphe Adam
1831: Le Faubourien, comédie-vaudeville in 1 act
1831: Les Polonais ou Février 1831, impromptu mingled with couplets 
1831: Le Voyage de la Liberté, play in 4 acts mingled with songs with Fontan
1832: Les Chemins de fer, revue-vaudeville in 1 act with Arago and Maurice Alhoy, Vaudeville (31 December)
1832: Le Russe ou un Conseil de guerre, épisode de novembre 1831, drama in 2 acts mingled with couplets with Jules-Édouard Alboize de Pujol 
1832: L'Île d'amour, drama in 3 acts with Pujol
1832: La Vengeance italienne ou le Français à Florence, comédie-vaudeville, with Charles-Gaspard Delestre-Poirson and Eugène Scribe
1832: Voltaire et Madame de Pompadour, comedy in 3 acts, with Jean-Baptiste-Pierre Lafitte
1832: Le Naufrage de la Méduse, drama in 5 acts, with Adolphe d'Ennery
1833: Le Royaume des femmes ou le Monde à l'envers, pièce fantastique in 2 acts, with Théodore Cogniard
1833: Le Souper du mari, opéra comique in 1 act, with Hippolyte Cogniard
1833: Le Mariage par ordre, épisode de l'histoire de Russie, drame-vaudeville in 2 acts, with Pujol
1834: Caravage (1599), drama in 3 acts, with Pujol
1834: Le Facteur ou la Justice des hommes, drama in 5 acts, with Charles Potier and Auguste-Louis-Désiré Boulé
1834: Un enfant, drama in 4 acts, imitated from the novel by Éléonore Tenaille de Vaulabelle
1834: Tout chemin mène à Rome, comédie-vaudeville in 1 act, with Lafitte
1834: Un soufflet, comédie vaudeville in 1 act, with Ennery
1835: La Femme du voisin, comédie vaudeville in 1 act 
1835: Zazezizozu, féerie-vaudeville in 5 acts
1835: Marguerite de Quélus, drama in 3 acts, with Paul Foucher and Alexandre de Lavergne
1835: La Traite des Noirs, drama in 5 acts and extravaganza, with Pujol
1835: L'Ombre du mari, comédie-vaudeville in 1 act, with Agénor Altaroche
1835: Chérubin ou le Page de Napoléon, comédie-vaudeville in 2 acts, with Adrien Payn and Adrien Delaville
1836: Madeleine la sabotière, comédie vaudeville in 2 acts, with Jean-François-Alfred Bayard and Lafitte
1836: La Folle, drama in 3 acts
1836: Vaugelas ou le Ménage d'un savant, comédie-vaudeville in 1 act
1836: Valérie mariée, ou Aveugle et Jalouse, drama in 3 acts, with Lafitte
1836: Le Puits de Champvert ou l'Ouvrier lyonnais, drama in 3 acts 
1836: Pierre le Grand, drama in 5 acts, with Hippolyte Auger
1836: Je suis fou, comédie-vaudeville in 1 act, with Foucher
1836: L'Épée de mon père, comédie-vaudeville in 1 act 
1837: La Nouvelle Héloïse, drama in 3 acts, with Charles Labie
1837: Paul et Julien, ou les Deux Vocations, comédie-vaudeville in 2 acts 
1837: Le Petit Chapeau ou le Rêve d'un soldat, fantastic drama in 6 parts 
1837: Le Bouquet de bal, comedy in 1 act 
1837: L'Ombre de Nicolet ou De plus fort en plus fort !, vaudeville épisodique in 1 act, with Charles Labie
1837: Rita l'espagnole, drama in 4 acts, with Boulé, Jules Chabot de Bouin and Eugène Sue
1837: Diane de Poitiers ou Deux fous et un roi, drama in 3 acts, with Hippolyte Rimbaut
1837: Valérie mariée, ou Aveugle et Jalouse, drama in 5 acts, with Lafitte
1838: La boulangère a des écus, comédie-vaudeville in 2 acts, with Gabriel de Lurieu and Emmanuel Théaulon
1838: La Maîtresse d'un ami, comédie-vaudeville in 1 act, with Chabot de Bouin
1838: Alix ou les Deux Mères, drama in 5 acts, with Alphonse Brot
1838: Le Général et le Jésuite, drama in 5 acts
1838: Richard Savage, drama in 5 acts 
1838: Les Bédouins en voyage, « odyssée africaine en trois chants » 
1839: Les Filles de l'enfer, fantastic drama in 4 acts, with Charles Dupeuty
1839: La Branche de chêne, drama in 5 acts, with Charles Lafont
1840: Ralph le bandit ou les Souterrains de Saint-Norbert, melodrama in 5 acts 
1840: Aubray le médecin, melodrama in 3 acts, with Bernard Lopez
1840: Le Tremblement de terre de la Martinique, drama in 5 acts, with Lafont
1840: Mazagran, bulletin de l'armée d'Afrique, in 3 acts, with Ferdinand Laloue
1841: Le Débutant, ou l'Amour et la Comédie, comedy in 1 act mingled with couplets 
1841: Le Marchand d'habits, drama in 5 acts, with Potier
1841: La Vie d'un comédien, comedy in 4 acts, with Eugène Labat
1841: La Mère de la débutante ou Je serai comédienne, comedy in 2 acts mingled with couplets 
1842: Claudine, drama in 3 acts drawn from the short story by Jean-Pierre Claris de Florian, with Lubize
1842: La Caisse d'épargne, comédie-vaudeville in 3 acts 
1842: Une jeunesse orageuse, comedy in 2 acts, with Louis Bergeron
1842: La Plaine de Grenelle, 1812, drama in 5 acts, with Hippolyte Leroux
1843: 6000 francs de récompense, drama in 5 acts 
1843: Sur les toits, vaudeville in 1 act, with Charles Foliguet
1843: La Chambre verte, comedy in 2 acts mingled with song, with Foliguet
1844: Jacques le corsaire, drama in 5 acts, with Eugène Nus
1845: Enfant chéri des dames, comédie-vaudeville in 2 acts, with Karl Holbein
1845: L'Enseignement mutuel, comedy in 3 acts in prose, with Eugène Nus
1846: Montbailly ou la Calomnie, drama in 5 acts 
1847: Le Trésor du pauvre, drama in 3 acts, mingled with songs, with Eugène Nus
1847: Jeanne d'Arc, drama in 5 acts and 10 tableaux 
1847: Rose et Marguerite ou Faut-il des époux assortis, comedy in 3 acts, with Charles-Henri-Ladislas Laurençot
1848: Arme au bras !..., chanson dédiée à la garde nationale d'Amiens
1849: Le Comte de Sainte-Hélène, drama in 5 acts and 7 tableaux, with Lambert-Thiboust and Eugène Nus
1849: Le Congrès de la paix, vaudeville in 1 act 
1849: Les Trois étages, ou Peuple, Noblesse et Bourgeoisie, drama in 3 acts 
1850: Le Roi de Rome, drama in 5 acts, with Léon Beauvallet preceded by Napoléon, prologue in 2 parts followed by La Ville éternelle, epilogue in 2 tableaux 
1850: Le Sopha, prologue-vaudeville in 1 act, with Eugène Labiche and Mélesville, preceded by Schahabaham XCIV
1851: La Dame aux trois couleurs, comédie-vaudeville in 3 acts, with Charles Raymond, Théâtre du Gymnase (18 June)
1851: L'Ivrogne et son enfant, vaudeville in 2 acts 
1851: Le Testament d'un garçon, drama in 3 acts, in prose, with Eugène Nus
1852: La Bergère des Alpes, drama in 5 acts, with d'Ennery
1852: Les Gaîtés champêtres, comédie-vaudeville in 2 acts, with Jules Janin, Armand Durantin and Léon Guillard
1855: La Rentrée à Paris, popular drame in 1 act, mingled with vaudevilles

References

Bibliography 
 Gustave Vapereau, « Louis-François-Charles Desnoyer », Dictionnaire universel des contemporains, Hachette, 1858, p. 523, on Gallica
 Gustave Vapereau, L'Année littéraire et dramatique, vol.1, 1858, p. 450 
 François Cavaignac, Eugène Labiche ou la Gaieté critique, 2003, p. 29
 Anne-Simone Dufief, Jean-Louis Cabanès, Le Roman au théâtre : Les Adaptations théâtrales au XIXe siècle, 2005, p. 64

19th-century French dramatists and playwrights
19th-century French male actors
French male stage actors
French theatre managers and producers
1806 births
Writers from Paris
1858 deaths